Gregory Whittlesea (born 23 July 1963) is a former Australian rules footballer who played with  in the Australian Football League (AFL) and with  and  in the South Australian National Football League (SANFL) during the 1980s and 1990s.
 
Whittlesea captained Sturt from 1987 to 1990 and won the Magarey Medal in 1988. He won successive best and fairest awards in 1987 and 1988. At the 1988 Adelaide Bicentennial Carnival he represented South Australia and earned All-Australian selection. In 1991 he was recruited by Hawthorn, but managed only four games.

He retired from football in 2004 having played 168 games for Yankalilla in the Great Southern Football League in South Australia.

External links 
 
 

1963 births
Hawthorn Football Club players
Living people
Magarey Medal winners
South Australian State of Origin players
Sturt Football Club players
All-Australians (1953–1988)
Australian rules footballers from South Australia